Shoop is a surname. Notable people with the surname include:

Bob Shoop, American football coach and player
Brian Shoop, American college baseball coach and player
Clarence A. Shoop, American pilot
John Shoop (born 1969), American football coach
Lindsay Shoop, American rower
Pamela Susan Shoop (born 1948), American actress
Ron Shoop, American baseball player
Rusty Shoop, American television journalist

Surnames of German origin